The following lists events that occurred in 2003 in Libya.

Incumbents
President: Muammar al-Gaddafi
Prime Minister: Imbarek Shamekh (until 14 June), Shukri Ghanem (starting 14 June)

Sports
 The 2003–04 Libyan Premier League was the 36th edition of Libyan top-flight football, organised by the Libyan Football Federation. History was made this season, as Olomby of Zawiya, became the first side outside of the two biggest cities in the country (Tripoli and Benghazi) to win the premier division. Their feat is yet to be beaten.

 
Years of the 21st century in Libya
Libya
Libya
2000s in Libya